The 1958 Canada Cup took place 20–23 November at the Club de Golf México in Mexico City, Mexico. It was the sixth Canada Cup event, which became the World Cup in 1967. The tournament was a 72-hole stroke play team event with 32 teams. These were the same 30 teams that had competed in 1957 without Thailand but with the addition of Ecuador, Peru and Venezuela. Each team consisted of two players from a country. The combined score of each team determined the team results. The Irish team of Harry Bradshaw and Christy O'Connor Snr won by three strokes over the Spanish team of Ángel Miguel and Sebastián Miguel. The individual competition was won by Ángel Miguel, who beat Harry Bradshaw at the third hole of a sudden-death playoff.

Teams

Gerard de Wit, representing the Netherlands, never reached Mexico after the plane he was travelling in developed engine problems. Cees Cramer played as an individual.

Scores
Team

Lee Holbrook of Ecuador withdrew after the first round and Sam Snead of the United States withdrew after the second round.

International Trophy

Miguel beat Bradshaw at the third hole of a sudden-death playoff.

References

World Cup (men's golf)
Golf tournaments in Mexico
Canada Cup
Canada Cup